Harunobu is a crater on Mercury. It has a diameter of 107 kilometers. Its name was adopted by the International Astronomical Union in 1976. Harunobu is named for the Japanese artist Suzuki Harunobu, who lived from 1720 or 1724 to 1770.

References

Impact craters on Mercury